Walter James Wolffe  FSAScot FRIAS (born 20 December 1962) is a Scottish advocate who served as Lord Advocate from 2016 to 2021. He previously served as Dean of the Faculty of Advocates from 2014 to 2016, and Vice-Dean of the Faculty of Advocates from 2013 to 2014.

Early life

Walter James Wolffe was born on 20 December 1962 in Dumfries to Alexandra L. Graham and Antony C. Wolffe MBE. He attended Gatehouse Primary School and then Kirkcudbright Academy. Wolffe studied at the University of Edinburgh, graduating with an honours degree in law and a diploma in legal practice. He then went on to study at Balliol College, Oxford to take a Bachelor of Civil Law degree.

Legal career

Early career 

Wolffe trained as a solicitor at a commercial firm in Edinburgh. After qualifying, he worked as Legal Assistant to the Lord President of the Court of Session. After working for a year at Parliament House, Wolffe was admitted as an advocate in 1992. He served as First Standing Junior Counsel to the Scottish Government from 2002 to 2007. Wolffe took silk in 2007, earning the post nominal of QC. He spent ten years practicing in commercial and public law, before serving as full-time prosecutor as Advocate Depute at the High Court of Justiciary from 2007 to 2010. 

Wolffe has been instructed for cases at all levels, including the Supreme Court of the United Kingdom, the Judicial Committee of the Privy Council and the European Court of Human Rights. He has been called to the bar of England & Wales in 2013.

Dean of the Faculty of Advocates; 2014 to 2016 

Wolffe was elected Vice-Dean of the Faculty of Advocates in February 2013. In February 2014, he was elected Dean of the Faculty of Advocates, replacing Richard Keen. Wolffe was the winner of an election defeating Gordon Jackson QC, Andrew Smith QC and Alan Summers QC. Wolffe is the first Dean to be elected by an electronic vote. Following his election he responded: "It is a great honour to be elected by the Faculty as its Dean. The people of Scotland have been well served by the independent Bar throughout its existence. I look forward to leading the profession during the next chapter of its history."

Lord Advocate 

On 31 May 2016 the Scottish Government announced that First Minister Nicola Sturgeon had recommended Wolffe to the Scottish Parliament for appointment as Lord Advocate by the Queen. His appointment was confirmed by the Scottish Parliament on 1 June 2016.

In 2020, Wolffe informed the Scottish Government of his intention to step down as Scotland's Lord Advocate after the May 2021 Scottish Parliament election. Prior to Nicola Sturgeon's re-election as First Minister, it was confirmed that both Wolffe and Solicitor General Alison Di Rollo, would resign as Scotland's law officers.

Awards and honours 

Wolffe had the following wards and honours:

 Member of the Privy Council of the United Kingdom;
 Queen's Counsel (which became King's Counsel on 8 September 2022 upon the death of Queen Elizabeth II and the accession of King Charles III);
 Fellow of the Royal Society of Edinburgh;
 Honorary LLD, Glasgow University;
 Fellow of the Society of Antiquaries of Scotland;
 Fellow of the European Law Institute;
 Honorary Fellow of the Royal Incorporation of Architects in Scotland;
 Honorary Bencher, King's Inns, Dublin

Personal life 

Wolffe married Sarah Poyntell LaBudde, Lady Wolffe, in 1987, a Senator of the College of Justice in the Supreme Courts of Scotland. They have two sons.

References

External links 

Wolffe's professional CV

Living people
Deans of the Faculty of Advocates
People from Dumfries
People educated at Kirkcudbright Academy
Alumni of Balliol College, Oxford
Alumni of the University of Edinburgh School of Law
Lord Advocates
Scottish King's Counsel
Members of the Privy Council of the United Kingdom
1962 births
21st-century Scottish lawyers
20th-century Scottish lawyers
21st-century King's Counsel